The Lakshmi Tantra is one of the Pāñcarātra texts that is dedicated to the goddess Lakshmi and Narayana (Vishnu) in Hinduism. It forms a part of the Agamas. The Lakshmi Tantra is devoted to the worship of the goddess Lakshmi (the shakti of Vishnu-Narayana), although it also glorifies all women in general.

Date 
The text was composed sometime between the ninth and twelfth centuries.

Contents

The Lakshmi Tantra deals mainly with Pāñcarātra philosophy and cosmogony, as well as the mantra sastra. The ritualistic side of worship is not emphasised. The iconography for Lakshmi-Narayana and Vishnu’s Vyūhas is discussed. Temple architecture and temple worship are totally omitted. The text also ignores public festivals, death rites, and expiatory rights. Some speculate that this silence indicates that the Lakshmi Tantra concerns itself only with the individual worshipper, who desires to be released from the miseries of worldly existence.

The text may also be categorised as Vaishnava, since it glorifies Lakshmi-Narayana as supreme:

The Lakshmi Tantra is shown to have distinct similarities with the Pratik Rahasyam of Devi Mahatmya, showing an assimilation of Vaishnavas with Shakta-lore, which is extremely rare. The episode describing how the Supreme Shakti, Adi Mahalakshmi, transforms into her complete incarnation, Mahalakshmi or Mahasri, who is shown holding a mace, a shield, a citron, and a bowl. She is golden in colour, and on her crown she holds a lingam and a multi-headed snake which symbolizes the Trideva; linga meaning Shiva, yoni meaning Vishnu, and the snake representing Brahma. She represents the rajas guna. From here it is quite similar to what is seen in the Pratik Rahasyam, Mahalakshmi creates Mahakali/Mahamaya and Mahasaraswati/Mahavidya who represent the tamas guna and satva guna, respectively. However, unlike in the Pratika Rahasyam, where the Devis create the Trimurti and the Tridevi on their own, in the Lakshmi Tantra, Adi Purusha, or Parama Vasudeva, creates three of the Chaturvyuha, Pradyumna, Aniruddha, and Sankarshana. Pradyumna is linked with Mahasri, who create Brahma and Lakshmi (named as Padma), Sankarshana is linked with Mahamaya, creating Shiva and Saraswati, and Aniruddha and Mahavidya are linked together, creating Vishnu and Gauri/Parvati. Here, the union of male and female energies link to create srishti, or life.

The text precisely expounds the specifics of the philosophy of qualified monism Vishishtadvaita, but it is also observed that it is much inspired from the philosophy of Pratyabhijna of Kashmiri Shaivism propounded by Abhinavagupta. The text also reveals traces of Mahayana Buddhism. The influence of the Bhagavad Gita is also clearly apparent and passages from it have sometimes been quoted literally.

Manifestations 
The Lakshmi Tantra discusses the various avataras, or the descents, of the goddess, when Narayana incarnates on earth, to perform her anuvrata, or functions. These descents are called the six sheaths, and are categorised as possessing one form, two forms, four forms, six forms, eight forms, as well as twelve forms:

 Mahālakṣmī, as the first manifestation of the Goddess
 Śri and Puṣṭi, as two manifestations on either side of Narayana
 Śri, Kīrti, Jayā, and Māyā, as four manifestations around Narayana
 Śuddhi, Nirañjana, Nityā, Jñānaśakti, Aparājitā, and Prakṛti as six manifestations, in a hexagonal position
 Lakṣmī, Sarasvatī, Sarvakāmadā, Prītivardinī, Yaśaskarī, Śāntidā, Tuṣṭida, and Puṣṭi, as eight manifestations
 Śri, Kāmeśvarī, Kānti, Kriyā, Śakti, Vibhūti, Icchā, Prīti, Ratī, Māyā, Dhī, and Mahiman, as twelve manifestations, in a double hexagonal position

In the Dashavatara and the other incarnations of Vishnu, Lakshmi appears as Bhudevi for Varaha, Bhargavi for Dattatreya, Padma for Vamana, Dharani for Parashurama, Sita for Rama, Revati for Balarama, Rukmini for Krishna, Rati for Pradyumna, Usha for Aniruddha, and Tara for Buddha.

References

Hindu texts